The Embroiderers' Guild is the UK's leading educational charity promoting embroidery.

History
The guild was formed in September 1906 at a meeting of sixteen ex-students of the Royal School of Art Needlework, under the name The Society of Certificated Embroideresses of the Royal School of Art Needlework. Miss Wade, head of the Royal School of Art Needlework was invited to be founder President, and Miss Scott who hosted the inaugural meeting and Beatrice Paulson Townsend, wife of W.G. Paulson Townsend, design master at the school, were invited to be vice-chairs.  They separated during World War I but reunited after the war and began teaching embroidery to shell shocked and disabled servicemen as a form of occupational therapy.

In 1920 Louisa Frances Persel (1870-1947) was appointed as the first President. By the time of World War II the Guild was well established and continued to promote the therapeutic value of embroidery.

In the 1960s an offshoot of the Embroiderers' Guild was developed as a platform to exhibit professional embroidery to the public. Founded in 1962 and originally named 'The Professional Group of the Embroiderers' Guild', the group brought attention to textile art nationally and internationally. Around twenty years later the group was later renamed The 62 Group of Textile Artists when the group decided to extend beyond embroidery and encompass other textile disciplines.

The Guild's centre at Bucks County Museum is a registered museum and holds a nationally significant, global collection of embroideries from early times to the present day.

The Guild and its members have created and exhibited works inspired by the 2012 London Olympics (over 2000 postcard sized images of participating nations); in partnership with the British Library and Ruskin College, Oxford led the design and creation of a piece designed by Cornelia Parker commemorating the 800th anniversary of Magna Carta; in partnership with the Landscape Institute/National Trust/English Heritage the Guild created over 40 exhibitions of work inspired by the life and times of Lancelot 'Capability' Brown (2015/2016) and in 2016 the Guild was commissioned by the London representatives of HBO Television to create a piece 3.3 metres high and 5.5 metres long depicting the WhiteWalker from 'A Game of Thrones' - 'The Hardhome Embroidery'. This piece was exhibited at 10 venues throughout the UK.

Financial crisis

In 2021 it was reported that the Guild was in financial crisis. Local branches had had their bank accounts frozen by the Guild. Some members had been unhappy for years about the way the Guild was run. Some members criticised the high salary received by the CEO, who was not himself an embroiderer, and who has been described as "a highly paid male specialist in corporate turnarounds" running an organisation whose members are mostly women. Some Guild members used craftivism to make their concerns public. The meeting held by trustees for members to discuss this and to vote on the future of the branches has been called "At the very best ... a PR nightmare. At the worst, it was the outward expression of a charity that was already eating itself whole". The trustees' proposal to close the branches was carried. Each branch will have a grant of at least £250 to establish itself as an independent group.

References

Further reading
Embroidery: the journal of the Embroiderers' Guild; Diamond Jubilee 1966; foreword, John L. Nevinson; p. 1

External links
Embroiderers' Guild official site

Embroidery
Private companies limited by guarantee of the United Kingdom
Embroidery in the United Kingdom
1906 establishments in the United Kingdom